Maryborough State High School (commonly abbreviated as 'MSHS') is an Independent Public School located in Maryborough, Queensland, Australia. The school is run by the Queensland State Government, and is split on either side of Kent Street. The school colours are blue and brown. In 2022 MSHS had 1260 students (including 79 students identifying as indigenous) with 102 teachers and 60 non-teaching staff (35 full-time equivalent).

The school has had many incarnations, starting its life as Maryborough Boys Grammar School and Maryborough Girls Grammar School, then from 1937 a segregated boys and girls state high school. The school became coeducational from 1974. From 2017, Maryborough State High School is an Independent Public School. The school is the only Regional Queensland School identified as a Brisbane Roar School of Football for Soccer Excellence.

The school was commended in 2020 for three excellence awards at the Australian Education Awards for Best Government School, Best Regional School and Best Co-Curricular Program. The school was also awarded an Excellence Award for Best Secondary Government School in Australia in 2021. Maryborough State High School has won the Fraser Coast Educator of the Year every Year since 2018, and has now been ‘retired’ into the Hall of Fame.

History 

The Maryborough Boys Grammar School was founded on the north side of Kent Street in 1881 and the Maryborough Girls Grammar School on the south of Kent Street in 1883. An assembly hall was added to the side of the Girls Grammar School in 1888. Four Rhodes scholars graduated from Maryborough Boys Grammar School and many students went on to distinguished careers. Hit hard by the effects of the Great Depression, the Grammar Schools were forced to close. They were subsequently taken over by the Department of Education in 1936 to become the Maryborough State High and Intermediate School for Boys and Maryborough State High and Intermediate School for Girls.

The Boys' and Girls' High Schools were amalgamated in 1974 to form Maryborough State High School. The school has a long-standing tradition of excellence in the Maryborough region and has had many notable Australians attend the school.

The original building of Maryborough Boys Grammar School was listed on the Queensland Heritage Register in 1992. It now houses the English and Humanities Departments.

Location 

The campus is situated on either side of Kent Street adjacent to the Maryborough CBD.

Facilities 

The school has a number of sporting facilities - an artificial hockey surface, multipurpose gymnasium, oval and air conditioned gym. There are six computer labs with network and internet access with individual user accounts. The school also offers a Bring Your Own Device (BYOx) model so all students can bring their own computer or device to use in all classrooms. From 2017 the school also offers academies in Hockey, Football (soccer), rowing and STEM subjects (Science, Technology, Engineering and Mathematics). The Murdoch Darling Centre, a state of the art performing arts space seating up to 1000, was completed in 2018. The school has seen $10 million of upgrades during 2019-20, with the Student Enrichment Precinct opened in 2021.

Notable alumni and staff
Notable alumni of the school include:
 Duncan Chapman, first soldier of the Australian Imperial Forces to land at Gallipoli
 Gordon Dunbar, Rhodes Scholar, soldier awarded Military Cross and Croix de Guerre
 Geoff Dymock, cricketer
 William Glasgow, soldier and senator
 Henry Lionel Harvey, Rhodes Scholar, died World War I
 Robert Alexander Hunter, served at Gallipoli and was mayor of Maryborough (1956 – 1964)
 Grant Hayden Kenny, ironman champion
 Kay Lehmann (née Kindervater), hockey champion
 Percy Reginald Stephensen, Rhodes Scholar, writer and publisher
 David Theile, Olympic swimmer
 Robert Edwin White, Rhodes Scholar and professor of soil science

Staff who have worked at the school include Amy Hannah Adamson, who was both an alumna (Maryborough Girls' Grammar School) and headmistress (Maryborough State High and Intermediate School from 1949–1959).

There are currently over 26 alumni working at the school - former students who have returned to the school in many roles, from teacher aides to teaching staff, administration and Heads of Department.

References

External links

Maryborough State High School website

Public high schools in Queensland
Maryborough, Queensland
Schools in Wide Bay–Burnett
Educational institutions established in 1881
1881 establishments in Australia
Queensland Heritage Register